Southern Theater or Southern Theatre may refer to:

The Southern Theater, Minneapolis, Minnesota
Southern Theatre (Columbus, Ohio)
Southern Theatres, American movie theater chain
Southern Theatre Arts Centre, a performing arts school in England

Military
Southern theater of the American Revolutionary War
Southern Theater Command, one of the five military regions of China's People's Liberation Army

See also
Nanxi (theatre), a historical form of Chinese opera, sometimes translated literally as "Southern Theatre"